The Viramgam–Okha line is a railway passing through Gujarat State, in western India.

Geography
The Viramgam–Okha line passes through Central part of Gujarat connecting Surendranagar, Wankaner, Rajkot and Jamnagar. It is explained in detailed in sections:
Viramgam–Surendra Nagar section
Wankaner–Surendra Nagar section
Rajkot–Wankaner section

History
Viramgam–Okha section was laid by a number of Princely States and is initially a metre gauge line. Ahmedabad–Viramgam section was opened by Bombay, Baroda and Central India Railway by 1871 and was extended to Wadhwan by 1872. Surendra Nagar-Rajkot section was opened by Morvi State Railway in 1890. Rajkot-Jamnagar line was opened by 1897 and Jamnagar-Okha section was opened in 1922 by Jamnagar & Dwarka Railway. Rajkot-Junagadh-Veraval section was merged with Saurashtra Railway in April 1948. Saurashtra Railway was merged into Western Railway on 5 November 1951. Gauge conversion of Viramgam-Hapa section completed on 17 June 1980 and Hapa-Okha section by 24 April 1984 by Indian Railways.

References

5 ft 6 in gauge railways in India

1922 establishments in India
Western Railway zone
Railway lines in Gujarat